Vaughan Lee Harvey (born 15 October 1982) is an English mixed martial artist currently competing in the Bantamweight division. A professional competitor since 2003, Lee has formerly competed for the UFC and Cage Rage.

Background
Born and raised in Birmingham, England, Lee began training in traditional martial arts at the age of 13.

Mixed martial arts career

Early career
Lee held an amateur record of 1-0 before making his professional debut on 22 February 2003 against Philly San at Cage Rage 2. He won by TKO in the first second of the first round.

Ultimate Fighting Championship
In his UFC debut, Lee faced Chris Cariaso on 5 October 2011 at UFC 138, losing via split decision.

Lee faced off with Norifumi Yamamoto on 26 February 2012 at UFC 144. Lee defeated Yamamoto via first round armbar, becoming the first person to submit Yamamoto in his MMA career. The performance also earned Lee Submission of the Night honors.

Lee next faced T.J. Dillashaw on 11 July 2012 at UFC on Fuel TV: Munoz vs. Weidman.  He lost the fight via submission in the first round.

Lee next faced Motonobu Tezuka on 16 February 2013 at UFC on Fuel TV: Barão vs. McDonald. He won the fight via unanimous decision.

Lee faced Raphael Assunção on 8 June 2013 at UFC on Fuel TV 10. He lost the fight via armbar submission in the second round.

Lee was expected to face promotional newcomer Sergio Pettis on 16 November 2013 at UFC 167. However, Lee was forced out of the bout due to injury a week before the fight and was replaced by Will Campuzano.

Lee faced Nam Phan on 1 March 2014 at The Ultimate Fighter: China Finale. He won the fight via unanimous decision.

Lee faced Iuri Alcântara on 31 May 2014 at UFC Fight Night 41. He lost the fight by KO early in the first round.

Lee faced Patrick Holohan in a flyweight bout on 18 July 2015 at UFC Fight Night 72.  He lost the fight via unanimous decision and was subsequently released from the promotion shortly after.

Personal life
Aside from fighting, Lee works as a personal trainer.

Mixed martial arts record

|-
|Loss
|align=center|14–14–1
|Jack Shore
|Decision (unanimous)
|Cage Warriors 92
|
|align=center|3
|align=center|5:00
|London, England
|
|-
|Loss
|align=center|14–13–1
|Nathaniel Wood
|TKO (punches)
|Cage Warriors 82
|
|align=center|2
|align=center|4:22
|Grozny, Russia
|
|-
|Loss
|align=center|14–12–1
|Rakhman Dudaev
|Decision (unanimous)
|Akhmat Fight Show 13: Battle in Grozny
|
|align=center|3
|align=center|5:00
|Liverpool, England
|
|-
|Loss
|align=center|14–11–1
|Patrick Holohan
|Decision (unanimous)
|UFC Fight Night: Bisping vs. Leites 
|
|align=center|3
|align=center|5:00
|Glasgow, Scotland
|
|-
| Loss
| align=center| 14–10–1
| Iuri Alcântara
| KO (punches)
| UFC Fight Night: Muñoz vs. Mousasi
| 
| align=center| 1
| align=center| 0:25
| Berlin, Germany
| 
|-
|  Win 
| align=center| 14–9–1 
| Nam Phan
| Decision (unanimous) 
| The Ultimate Fighter China Finale: Kim vs. Hathaway
| 
| align=center| 3
| align=center| 5:00
| Macau, SAR, China
| 
|-
|  Loss
| align=center| 13–9–1
| Raphael Assunção
| Submission (armbar)
| UFC on Fuel TV: Nogueira vs. Werdum
| 
| align=center| 2
| align=center| 1:51
| Fortaleza, Brazil
| 
|-
|  Win
| align=center| 13–8–1
| Motonobu Tezuka
| Decision (unanimous)
| UFC on Fuel TV: Barão vs. McDonald
| 
| align=center| 3
| align=center| 5:00
| London, England
| 
|-
|  Loss
| align=center| 12–8–1
| T.J. Dillashaw
| Submission (neck crank)
| UFC on Fuel TV: Muñoz vs. Weidman
| 
| align=center| 1
| align=center| 2:33
| San Jose, California, United States
| 
|-
|  Win
| align=center| 12–7–1
| Norifumi Yamamoto
| Submission (armbar)
| UFC 144
| 
| align=center| 1
| align=center| 4:29
| Saitama, Japan
| 
|-
|  Loss
| align=center| 11–7–1
| Chris Cariaso
| Decision (split)
| UFC 138
| 
| align=center| 3
| align=center| 5:00
| Birmingham, England
| 
|-
|  Win
| align=center| 11–6–1
| Mark Jones
| TKO (flying knee and punches)
| Sprawl 'N Brawl: Revelation
| 
| align=center| 1
| align=center| 1:29
| Birmingham, England
| 
|-
|  Win
| align=center| 10–6–1
| Ian Cox
| Submission (guillotine choke)
| Fight UK 4
| 
| align=center| 1
| align=center| 0:29
| Leicester, England
| 
|-
|  Win
| align=center| 9–6–1
| Rob Bunford
| Submission (armbar)
| Sprawl 'N Brawl
| 
| align=center| 1
| align=center| 1:04
| Birmingham, England
| 
|-
| Draw
| align=center| 8–6–1
| James Doolan
| Draw
| OMMAC 8: Blood, Sweat and Tears
| 
| align=center| 3
| align=center| 5:00
| Liverpool, England
| 
|-
|  Win
| align=center| 8–6
| Steve McCombe
| Submission (rear-naked choke)
| Bushido Challenge 2: A New Dawn
| 
| align=center| 1
| align=center| 2:26
| Nottingham, England
| 
|-
|  Loss
| align=center| 7–6
| Ashleigh Grimshaw
| Submission (triangle choke)
| Cage Gladiators 12
| 
| align=center| 1
| align=center| 3:32
| Liverpool, England
| 
|-
|  Win
| align=center| 7–5
| Mark Chen
| Submission (rear-naked choke)
| AM 18: Holly Brawl
| 
| align=center| 3
| align=center|N/A
| Weston Super Mare, England
| 
|-
|  Loss
| align=center| 6–5
| David Lee
| Submission (rear-naked choke)
| Cage Gladiators 7
| 
| align=center| 1
| align=center| 2:11
| Liverpool, England
| 
|-
|  Loss
| align=center| 6–4
| Brad Pickett
| TKO (punches)
| Cage Rage Contenders 6
| 
| align=center| 3
| align=center| 3:20
| London, England
| 
|-
|  Win
| align=center| 6–3
| Antanas Jazbutis
| Decision (unanimous)
| AMMA FC 2
| 
| align=center| 3
| align=center| 5:00
| Birmingham, England
| 
|-
|  Win
| align=center| 5–3
| John Waite
| TKO (punches)
| AM 12: Wired
| 
| align=center| 1
| align=center|N/A
| Weston Super Mare, England
| 
|-
|  Win
| align=center| 4–3
| Denas Banevicius
| Submission (rear-naked choke)
| Cage Gladiators 3
| 
| align=center| 1
| align=center| 1:06
| Liverpool, England
| 
|-
|  Win
| align=center| 3–3
| Rob Molineux
| TKO (corner stoppage)
| Cage Gladiators 2
| 
| align=center| 1
| align=center| 1:08
| Liverpool, England
| 
|-
|  Win
| align=center| 2–3
| Ben Vickers
| Submission (rear-naked choke)
| Intense Fighting 5
| 
| align=center| 1
| align=center| 4:58
| England
| 
|-
|  Win
| align=center| 1–3
| Rob Molineux
| TKO (punches)
| Cage Rage Contenders
| 
| align=center| 1
| align=center| 1:46
| London, England
| 
|-
|  Loss
| align=center| 0–3
| Lee Shearwood
| Submission (triangle choke)
| AM 8: KO
| 
| align=center| 2
| align=center| 1:16
| Worcestershire, England
| 
|-
|  Loss
| align=center| 0–2
| Ricky Moore
| Submission (armbar)
| Extreme Brawl 5
| 
| align=center| 1
| align=center|N/A
| Bracknell, England
| 
|-
|  Loss
| align=center| 0–1
| Philly San
| TKO (punches)
| Cage Rage 2
| 
| align=center| 2
| align=center|N/A
| London, England
|

See also
 List of current UFC fighters
 List of male mixed martial artists

References

External links
 
 
 
 
 
 Sherdog.com
 Mmaweekly.com
 Mmaajunkie.com
 Mmabay.co.uk
 Mmaplayground.com

1982 births
Living people
English male mixed martial artists
Sportspeople from Birmingham, West Midlands
Bantamweight mixed martial artists
Flyweight mixed martial artists
Ultimate Fighting Championship male fighters